Auguste Prasch-Grevenberg (22 August 1854 – 14 December 1945) was a German stage and film actress.

She was born in Darmstadt, Hesse, Germany and died in Weimar, Thuringia, Germany in 1945 at age 91.

Selected filmography
 The Plague of Florence (1919)
 During My Apprenticeship (1919)
 Countess Walewska (1920)
 A Woman's Revenge (1921)
 Your Brother's Wife (1921)
 The Thirteen of Steel (1921)
 Wandering Souls (1921)
 Rose of the Asphalt Streets (1922)
 Lust for Life (1922)
 Two Worlds (1922)
 Die Buddenbrooks (1923)
 Prater (1924)
 The Assmanns (1925)
 Pique Dame (1927)
 Out of the Mist (1927)
 The Queen of Spades (1927)
 Homesick (1927)
 Queen Louise (1927–28)
 The Saint and Her Fool (1928)
 The Old Fritz (1928)
 Waterloo (1929)
 The Immortal Heart (1939)

Bibliography
 Eisner, Lotte H. The Haunted Screen: Expressionism in the German Cinema and the Influence of Max Reinhardt. University of California Press, 2008.

External links

1854 births
1945 deaths
German film actresses
German silent film actresses
German stage actresses
Actors from Darmstadt
20th-century German actresses